Louth Academy is a co-educational secondary school located in Louth in the English county of Lincolnshire.

History
Monks' Dyke High School opened on Monks' Dyke Road in Louth in 1929. In September 2012 the school merged with Tennyson High School in Mablethorpe to form Monks' Dyke Tennyson College. The school continued to operate over both sites until August 2016 when the Mablethorpe site closed.

Previously a foundation school administered by Lincolnshire County Council, in September 2017 Monks' Dyke Tennyson College converted to academy status and was renamed Louth Academy. The school is now sponsored by the Lincolnshire Gateway Academies Trust (formerly Tollbar Multi Academy Trust). At the same time Cordeaux Academy (located on North Holme Road in Louth) merged with the new Louth Academy. The school is now based over both sites.

As of 2022, Louth Academy has received a 'Good' rating from Ofsted after previously being 'Inadequate'.

Current principal is Mr Philip Dickinson.

Notable former pupils

Monks’ Dyke
 Corinne Drewery
 Donald Pleasence
 Daniel Pearson (Green man Dan)

References

Secondary schools in Lincolnshire
Educational institutions established in 1929
1929 establishments in England
Louth, Lincolnshire
Academies in Lincolnshire